Otávio D'Ávila Bandeira (born 4 June 1963) is a Brazilian rower. He competed in the men's coxed four event at the 1992 Summer Olympics.

References

External links
 

1963 births
Living people
Brazilian male rowers
Olympic rowers of Brazil
Rowers at the 1992 Summer Olympics
Sportspeople from Porto Alegre